Étienne, Count Davignon  (born 4 October 1932 in Budapest, Hungary) is a Belgian former diplomat, top civil servant, businessman, and former vice-president of the European Commission.

Career

After receiving a Doctorate of Law from the Catholic University of Louvain, Davignon joined the Belgian Foreign Ministry, in 1959, and within two years had become an attaché under Paul-Henri Spaak, then Minister of Foreign Affairs. He remained in Belgian government until 1965. In 1970, he chaired the committee of experts which produced the Davignon report on foreign policy for Europe.

Davignon later became the first head of the International Energy Agency, from 1974 to 1977, before becoming a member of the European Commission, of which he was vice-president from 1981 until 1985. From 1989 to 2001, he was chairman of the Belgian bank Société Générale de Belgique, which is now part of the French supplier Engie and was not an arm of the French bank Société Générale, but a Belgian institution. As of 2010 he was Vice Chairman of Suez subsidiary Suez-Tractebel.

As chairman of Société Générale de Belgique, he was a member of the European Round Table of Industrialists. He is the current co-chairman of the EU-Japan Business Dialogue Round Table, chairman of the Paul-Henri Spaak Foundation, president of the EGMONT – Royal Institute for International Relations, chairman of CSR Europe, chairman of the European Academy of Business in Society and was chairman of the annual Bilderberg conference from 1998 to 2001. He is a member of the Steering Committee of the Bilderberg Group.

Davignon is the chairman of the board of directors of Brussels Airlines, which he co-founded after the bankruptcy of Sabena. He is also a member of the board of numerous Belgian companies, and is the chairman of the board of directors and of the General Assembly of the ICHEC Brussels Management School.

On 26 January 2004, Davignon was given the honorary title of Minister of State, giving him a seat on the Crown Council of Belgium.

Created Count Davignon by King Philippe in 2018.

Davignon is a crucial member of the Strategic Advisory Panel of The European Business Awards. He is a member of the Cercle Gaulois and a member of the advisory board of the Itinera Institute think tank. He is also president of the Brussels-based think tank Friends of Europe.

Family
Davignon was the long-term partner of Antoinette Spaak, daughter of Paul-Henri Spaak, whom he had met while working as his chef de cabinet.

Étienne's grandfather, Julien Davignon, also served in the government of Belgium, being Minister for Foreign Affairs in 1914, at the outbreak of World War I.

Honours 

 Minister of State, by Royal Decree.
 Knight Grand Cross of the Legion of Honour.
 Officer in the Order of the Crown.
 Grand Officer of the Order of the Republic.
 Grand Officer of the Order of Saint Gregory the Great.
 Grand Officer of the Order of the Oak Crown.
 Grand Officer of the Order of the Dannebrog.
 Grand Officer of the Order of the Aztec Eagle.
 Knight Commander of the Order of the Crown of Thailand.
 Knight Commander of the Order of Saint Olav.
 Knight Commander of the Order of Merit of the Federal Republic of Germany.
 Knight Commander of the Order of the Polar Star.
 Knight Commander of the Order of Orange-Nassau.
 Officer of the Order of the Phoenix.
 Officer of the Most Distinguished Order of Saint Michael and Saint George.

References

External links

Curriculum vitae at Corporate Europe Observatory
BBC interview
Interview at the Historical Archives of the European Union in Florence

|-

|-

|-

|-

1932 births
Catholic University of Leuven (1834–1968) alumni
Belgian businesspeople
Belgian European Commissioners
Belgian Ministers of State
Centre démocrate humaniste politicians
Chairmen of the Steering Committee of the Bilderberg Group
Living people
Members of the Steering Committee of the Bilderberg Group
Hungarian emigrants to Belgium
Société Générale de Belgique
Counts of Belgium
European Commissioners 1977–1981
European Commissioners 1981–1985
Bessemer Gold Medal